The War Industry Committees (WIC) were set up in Imperial Russia in 1915 in order to respond to the munitions crisis particularly following a series of defeats on the Galician Front in April 1915. The first congress of the war-industries committees was held on ees  25-27 July, 1915.

Whereas there were 226 district and local committees set up by February 1916, the Central War Industry Committee had a specific role in terms of allocating money, contracts and materials on behalf of the state. The local committees developed according to the conditions from which they emerged as there was not always a strong link with the Central WIC. The Moscow WIC, for example, was quite independent of the Central WIC, and under Pavel Ryabushinsky they frequently organised contracts without going through the Central WIC. By 1917 59 committees were running factories.

Workers' Groups

Central War Industry Committee
In July 1915 Alexander Guchkov, of the Progressive Bloc was elected chair of the Central War Industry Committee. Peter Palchinsky was deputy chair.

See also
Committee for Military-Technical Assistance

References

Russian Empire